Icon is a compilation album by American country artist Trisha Yearwood. It was released on August 31, 2010 via MCA Nashville Records and charted on the Billboard country albums chart. It was one of several compilations released by MCA following Yearwood's departure from the label in 2007. It contained a series of Yearwood's biggest hits from her years at the label.

Background, release and reception
In early 2007, Trisha Yearwood left MCA Records, her record label since having her first major hit in 1991. She later moved to Big Machine Records to record one album before taking a hiatus from recording. Icon was among a series of compilation albums released by her former label in the wake of departure. It contained a total of 12 previously-recorded hit singles by Yearwood between 1991 and 2001. 

The album contained tracks cut by various record producers from Yearwood's collection. Seven of the album's tracks were produced by Garth Fundis. The hits, "How Do I Live," "Perfect Love" and "There Goes My Baby" were produced by Tony Brown. "I Would've Loved You Anyway" was produced by both Mark Wright and Yearwood herself. "XXX's and OOO's (An American Girl)" was produced by Harry Stinson. Andy McKaie produced the compilation itself.

Icon was released on August 31, 2010 via MCA Nashville. It was issued as a compact disc and was part of MCA's Icon compilation series. The album spent a total of six weeks on the Billboard Top Country Albums chart, reaching number 69 in October 2010. It was Yearwood's third compilation album to chart on a Billboard list. Icon received a positive review from Stephen Thomas Erlewine of Allmusic, who gave the release four out of five stars. "Universal’s 2010 collection Icon is an excellent 12-track sampler of Trisha Yearwood’s biggest hits," Erlewine wrote in 2010.

Track listing

Personnel
All credits are adapted from liner notes of Icon.

Musical and technical personnel
 Tony Brown – producer
 Mark Diehl – design
 Jill Ettinger – product manager
 Jo Ann Frederick – A&R assistance
 Garth Fundis – producer
 Russ Harrington – photography
 Andy McKaie – compilation producer
 Ryan Null – photo coordination
 Beth Stempel – production manager
 Harry Stinson – producer
 Vartan – art direction
 Mark Wright – producer
 Trisha Yearwood – lead vocals, harmony vocals, producer

Charts

Release history

References

2010 compilation albums
MCA Records compilation albums
Trisha Yearwood compilation albums